Alan Lawrence Sitomer (born 1967) is California's Teacher of the Year (2007) and an author of young adult fiction, teacher methodology texts, and children's literature. He has written several widely held books and has become nationally renowned for his successful work in secondary literacy instruction, particularly when it comes to engaging reluctant readers.

Biography
Born in New York on February 15, 1967, Sitomer earned a B.A. degree from the University of Southern California, a teaching certificate from San Diego State University, and a master's degree from National University (California). He has taught English, Creative Writing, Speech & Debate and AVID classes at Lynwood High School in Lynwood, Los Angeles County, California and was named California's 2007 teacher of the year by the California Department of Education.

When asked about how he brings a book to life, he answered, "I show all of my books to real kids first. My students, former students, fans I have gotten to know from around the country, they all get to check out my books hot off the press before anyone else gets a chance to see them. That means before my literary agent. That means before my editor. That means before anyone in the adult world who works in “the publishing industry”. Real kids are my readers and if they don’t like something – if they don’t laugh, if they don’t cry, if they don’t approve – then it doesn’t really matter what the adults think. I write for them!" When asked of where he got his ideas for his books, he said, "My ideas come from funny things that happen to me... and they come from the painful parts of life... you can't have one without the other."

In addition to being a former inner-city high school English teacher and professor in the Graduate School of Education at Loyola Marymount University, Sitomer is a nationally renowned speaker specializing in engaging reluctant readers. He received the 2004 award for Classroom Excellence from the Southern California Teachers of English and the 2003 Teacher of the Year honor from California Literacy. In April 2007, he was named Educator of the Year by Loyola Marymount University and in February 2008 the Insight Education Group named Alan Lawrence Sitomer the Innovative Educator of the Year.

Sitomer has also authored multiple young adult novels published by Disney and Penguin Putnam which include The Hoopster, Hip-Hop High School, Homeboyz, The Secret Story of Sonia Rodriguez, Nerd Girls: The Rise of the Dorkasaurus, The Downside of Being Up, Daddies Do It Different, CinderSmella, and Nerd Girls: A Catastrophe of Nerdish Proportions.

The American Library Association named Homeboyz a Top Ten Book of the Year 2008. It also received the prestigious ALA Quick Pick Recognition for young adult novel which best engages reluctant readers. The Secret Story of Sonia Rodriguez was nominated for the same award.

Sitomer is the author of Hip-Hop Poetry & the Classics, a text being used in classrooms across the United States to illuminate classic poetry through hip-hop in order to engage disengaged students in both poetry and academics.

Additionally, Sitomer has written a teacher’s methodology book for Scholastic titled Teaching Teens & Reaping Results: In a Wi-Fi, Hip-Hop, Where-Has-All-The-Sanity-Gone World.

Most recently, Sitomer has authored The Alan Sitomer BookJam. BookJams have been designed to nail core language arts standards, raise test scores, and return teachers to a position of strength. By bringing real books back into the classroom through a student-centric approach to learning in order to achieve core curriculum objectives, teachers can utilize all the tools Alan Sitomer utilizes in his own classroom each and every day. BookJams are literally “straight out of Alan's private filing cabinet” and include a host of core, standards-based activities and lesson plans as well as a dynamic spectrum of 21st-century, hands-on learning projects. Intelligent grading rubrics, differentiated assessments and award-winning literature are all included.

Bibliography
The Hoopster Trilogy 
 The Hoopster (2005)
 Hip Hop High School (2006)
 Homeboyz (2007)

Standalone novels 
 The Secret Story of Sonia Rodriguez (2008)
 Nerd Girls: Rise of the Dorkasaurus
 The Downside of Being Up
 Nerd Girls: The Rise of the Dorkasaurus
 The Downside of Being Up
 Daddies Do It Different 
 CinderSmella 
 Nerd Girls: A Catastrophe of Nerdish Proportions
 Noble Warrior 
 Caged Warrior

References

External links

 Official website

Living people
1967 births
Schoolteachers from California
University of Southern California alumni
San Diego State University alumni
National University (California) alumni
21st-century American novelists
American male novelists
Writers from California
American writers of young adult literature
21st-century American male writers